A national referendum-plebiscite was held on October 16–17, 1976 in the Philippines in which the majority of the barangay voters approved the continuation of Martial Law and ratified the proposed amendments to the Constitution substituting the Regular Batasang Pambansa with the Interim Batasang Pambansa, pursuant to Presidential Decrees Nos. 991, 1031, and 1032.

Background 
For purposes of Philippine law, a ballot question on amending, revising or approving a constitution is a plebiscite; other ballot questions asked through a nationwide electorate are referendums:

Referendum 
There was a referendum if voters are in favor of extending martial law.

Constitutional plebiscite 
This was a constitutional plebiscite for approving amendments to the constitution:

 Replacing the Interim National Assembly with the Interim Batasang Pambansa of not more than 120 members unless otherwise provided by law, elected regionally and by sector, and includes the president.
 The Interim Batansang Pambansa, unlike the Interim National Assembly, will not have the power to approve treaties.
 The incumbent president will convene and preside over the Interim Batasang Pambansa until a speaker is elected.
 The president (prime minister) and cabinet shall exercise all powers and functions, and can only be disqualified based on what the president (prime minister) prescribes. The president (prime minister) can also appoint a deputy prime minister, or multiple deputy prime ministers.
 The incumbent president exercised legislative powers until martial law is lifted.
 The president (prime minister) can issue decrees, orders or letters of instruction if the Interim Batasang Pambansa or regular National Assembly fails to act on an emergency
 The barangays and sanggunians shall continue as presently constituted but their functions, powers, and composition may be altered by law.
 All provisions of this Constitution not inconsistent with any of these amendments shall continue in full force and effect.
 These amendments shall take effect after the incumbent President shall have proclaimed that they have been ratified by a majority of the votes cast in the referendum-Plebiscite.

Results

On extending martial law

On approving amendments to the constitution

Aftermath 
In 1977, another referendum asked the people if President Marcos should continue as president after the organization of the Interim Batasang Pambansa.

In 1978, a parliamentary election was held, the first in almost 7 years. The election led to the organization of the Interim Batasang Pambansa.

See also
Commission on Elections
Politics of the Philippines
Philippine elections

External links
 Presidential Decree No. 1033, s. 1976
Official website of the Commission on Elections

1976 elections in the Philippines
1976 referendums
Constitutional referendums in the Philippines
Presidency of Ferdinand Marcos